Teerasak Nakprasong (born November 6, 1985) is a member of the Thailand men's national volleyball team.

Clubs 
  Chonburi (2011–2012)
  Krungkao VC (2012–2014)
  Phitsanulok (2015–2018)
  Diamond Food VC (2018–)

Awards

Clubs 
 2011–12 Thailand League -  Champion, with Chonburi
 2015–16 Thailand League -  Champion, with Wing 46 Phitsanulok
 2015 Thai-Denmark Super League -  Runner-Up, with Phitsanulok
 2016 Thai-Denmark Super League -  Third, with Phitsanulok
 2017–18 Thailand League -  Third, with Phitsanulok
 2018–19 Thailand League -  Runner-Up, with Saraburi
 2019 Thai–Denmark Super League -  Third, with Saraburi

Royal decoration
 2015 -  Gold Medalist (Sixth Class) of The Most Admirable Order of the Direkgunabhorn

References 

1985 births
Living people
Teerasak Nakprasong
Teerasak Nakprasong
Volleyball players at the 2014 Asian Games
Teerasak Nakprasong
Southeast Asian Games medalists in volleyball
Competitors at the 2011 Southeast Asian Games
Competitors at the 2013 Southeast Asian Games
Competitors at the 2015 Southeast Asian Games
Teerasak Nakprasong